Tulsi Lal Amatya (May 1916 – August 1997) was a Nepalese politician.

Biography 
Amatya was born in May 1916 in Lalitpur, Nepal to Riddhinarsimha Malla Amatya and Yog Maya Awnatya.

In 1962, he served as the general secretary of the Communist Party of Nepal. The same year, the Communist Party of Nepal was split into two parties, the Communist Party of Nepal (Amatya), and the Communist Party of Nepal (Burma). Amatya also served as the Ambassador of Nepal to China from 1995 to 1996.

Tulsi Lal Amatya died in August 1997. In 2001, the Government of Nepal issued a stamp featuring Amatya.

Awards
Maha Ujwaol Rastradeep awards from the President of Nepal on 2021 (posthumously)

References

Further reading 

 

1916 births
1997 deaths
Communist Party of Nepal (original) politicians
Communist Party of Nepal (Amatya) politicians
People from Lalitpur District, Nepal
Nepalese political party founders
Ambassadors of Nepal to China
Nepal MPs 1959–1960